Curcuma comosa is a species of flowering plant in the ginger family. It is native to much of Asia, including Thailand, Indonesia, and Malaysia. The herb is cultivated in Thailand, especially in the Northern Province, including Petchaboon, and the Northeastern Province, including Loei. Curcuma comosa is widely used as a traditional herbal remedy.

Uses 

This medicinal plant is used for its anti-inflammatory properties in the treatment of postpartum uterine bleeding and uterine inflammation. Research suggests that Curcuma comosa extract possesses a strong anti-inflammatory activity and has a potential to be developed as a therapeutic compound for diverse neurological disorders associated with inflammation. Thai traditional practitioners use the rhizome of C. comosa in the treatment of women for the alleviation of postpartum uterine pain, the enhancement of uterine involution and the reduction of uterine inflammation after delivery. Numerous studies have been conducted on the effects of C. comosa showing that it can reduce blood cholesterol, increase the thickness of epithelial cells lining the vagina, and decrease uterine smooth muscle contraction. The plant is also used to repair vaginal wall prolapse, tighten vaginal muscles, and relieve premenstrual syndrome and cramping. It has been used for centuries in Thailand as a remedy for many other gynecological problems including vaginal dryness, hot flashes, excessive white and yellow vaginal discharge, bad odor, and irregular, excessive, or absent menstrual cycles. It appears to increase the effect of ovarian and testicular hormones, and may have an estrogenic effect. It is used in Thai luxury spas to lift sagging muscles, promote circulation, and provide good health and glowing skin.

Research 
Studies in Thailand researched the effects of crude extract from the root of Curcuma comosa on the uterus of the rat as compared to female estradiol hormone. Results reported included an increase in the thickness of the uterus epithelial cells lining the vagina and improved growth and induction of keratin synthesis in the mucous membrane of the vagina. However, estrogenic activities of Curcuma comosa were milder than those of estradiol.

Methanolic extract of rhizome of C. comosa has been proven to kill the roundworm Caenorhabditis elegans. The extract was purified to its active ingredients and it was found that some diphenylheptanoid compounds, such as 1,7-diphenyl-3-acetoxy-hept-trans-6-ene, can inhibit the motility of the roundworm.

Butanolic and ethyl acetate extract of rhizome of C. comosa had a stimulative effect on bile secretion and a decrease in blood cholesterol was reported. Separation of the active ingredients from diarylheptanoids and phloracetophenone glucoside compounds were carried out and some active compounds, such as 1,7-diphenyl-5-hydroxy-(1E)-1-heptene and 4,6-dihydroxy-2-o-(b-D-glucopyranosyl) acetophenone, were found to have a stimulative effect on bile secretion in rats.

A 95% ethanol extract of C. comosa decreased uterine smooth muscle contraction in rats.

An ethyl acetate extract of the rhizome was orally administered to male sheep and hamsters and a decrease in cholesterol and triglyceride were reported.

References

Further reading 
Piyachaturawat, P. et al., (1998). Growth-suppressing effect of Curcuma comosa extract on male reproductive organs in immature rats. Pharmaceutical Biol 36(1): 44–49.
Anonymous. (2000). Bureau of Agricultural Commodities Promotion and Management. Department of Agricultural Extension. Handbook of Medicinal Plants and Spices.
Drugs from Medicinal Plants. 1st ed. Bangkok
Jantaratnotai, N., et al. (2006). Inhibitory effect of Curcuma comosa on NO production and cytokine expression in LPS-activated microglia. Life Sci 78(6): 571–577.
Rattanachamnong P., et al. (2008). Effects of hexane extract of Curcuma comosa on plaque formation and platelet aggregation in hypercholesterolemic rabbits. Thai J Pharmacol 30(1): 88–92.
Kittichanun C., et al. (2010). Effects of Curcuma comosa extracts on hepatic cytochrome P450 activities in rats. J Health Res 24 (1): 1–6.

Plants described in 1810
Flora of Assam (region)
Flora of Myanmar
Flora of Thailand
comosa
Taxa named by William Roxburgh